Brigitte Elaine Burdine (August 8, 1962 – December 29, 2010) was an American voice-casting director who worked on several video games including World of Warcraft: Wrath of the Lich King. She was the head director of
SOCOM: U.S. Navy SEALs: Confrontation, having worked on other titles of the same series.

Death
Burdine was killed in a reported hit and run incident in Playa del Rey, late 2010.

Voice direction credits
300: March to Glory
CSI: Dark Motives
Justice League Heroes
Tales of Symphonia
X2: Wolverine's Revenge
Xenosaga Episode II

External links

References

1962 births
2010 deaths
People from Takoma Park, Maryland
Film directors from Maryland
Road incident deaths in California
American casting directors
Women casting directors
American voice directors